Oleksandr Nasonov (born 28 April 1992) is a Ukrainian professional footballer who plays as a defender for LNZ Cherkasy.

Career
Nasonov is product of youth team systems of the different Kyiv's sportive schools, and then he joined FC Dnipro Dnipropetrovsk. He did not play in the first Dnipro's team and signed a half-year loan contract with FC Volyn in February 2012.

He was called up to play for the Ukraine national under-21 football team by trainer Pavlo Yakovenko to the Commonwealth Cup in 2012.

In August 2020, the Moldovan Football Federation found three Speranța players – Nasonov, Matvey Guiganov, and Mihail Bolun – guilty of match-fixing and barred them from accessing any Moldovan football venue for one year.

References

External links
 

1992 births
Living people
Footballers from Kyiv
Piddubny Olympic College alumni
Ukrainian footballers
Ukrainian expatriate footballers
Association football defenders
Ukrainian Premier League players
Ukrainian First League players
Ukrainian Second League players
Ukrainian Amateur Football Championship players
Belarusian Premier League players
Moldovan Super Liga players
III liga players
FC Dnipro players
FC Volyn Lutsk players
FC Metalurh Donetsk players
FC Granit Mikashevichi players
FC Mariupol players
FC Arsenal Kyiv players
FC Lviv players
Speranța Nisporeni players
FC LNZ Cherkasy players
Pakhtakor Tashkent FK players
Expatriate footballers in Belarus
Expatriate footballers in Moldova
Expatriate footballers in Poland
Expatriate footballers in Uzbekistan
Ukrainian expatriate sportspeople in Belarus
Ukrainian expatriate sportspeople in Moldova
Ukrainian expatriate sportspeople in Poland
Ukrainian expatriate sportspeople in Uzbekistan
Ukraine youth international footballers
Ukraine under-21 international footballers